{{Speciesbox
| image = Parasola miser (P. Karst.) Redhead, Vilgalys & Hopple 496428.jpg
| genus = Parasola
| species = misera
| authority = (P.Karst.) Redhead, Vilgalys & Hopple (2001)
| synonyms = 
Coprinus miser 
Coprinus miser f. marasmioides 
Coprinus subtilisParasola miser Parasola misera f. marasmioides 
}}Parasola misera'' is a species of coprophilous fungus in the family Psathyrellaceae. It grows on the dung of goats and possibly on that of sheep.

References

Fungi described in 2001
Fungi of Greece
Psathyrellaceae